The 2019 Alabama Crimson Tide softball team is an American softball team, representing the University of Alabama for the 2019 NCAA softball season. The Crimson Tide play their home games at Rhoads Stadium. After losing in the 2018 NCAA Super Regionals, the 2019 team looks to make the postseason for the 21st straight year, and the Women's College World Series for twelfth time. This season represents the 23rd season of softball in the school's history.

Personnel

Roster

2019 Alabama Crimson Tide Softball Roster

Coaching staff

Schedule 

|-
!colspan=9| Trojan Classic

|-
!colspan=9| Hillenbrand Invitational

|-
!colspan=9| Easton Bama Bash

|-
!colspan=9| 

|-
!colspan=9| Easton Crimson Classic

|-
!colspan=9| 

|-
!colspan=9| Rainbow Wahine Classic

|-
!colspan=9| 

|-
!colspan=9|SEC softball tournament

|-
!colspan=9|NCAA Tuscaloosa Regional

|-
!colspan=9|NCAA Tuscaloosa Super Regional

|-
!colspan=9|Women's College World Series

Honors and awards
 Bailey Hemphill and Kaylee Tow were selected to the Preseason All-SEC Team.
 Kaylee Tow was named the SEC Player of the Week, February 11.
 Montana Fouts was named the SEC Freshman of the Week, February 18.
 Montana Fouts was named the SEC Freshman of the Week, February 25.
 Montana Fouts was named the SEC Freshman of the Week, March 12.
 Sarah Cornell was named the SEC Pitcher of the Week, April 16.
 Montana Fouts was named the SEC Pitcher of the Week, April 23.
 Sarah Cornell, Montana Fouts, and Bailey Hemphill were named First Team All-SEC.
 Maddie Morgan, and Elissa Brown were named Second Team All-SEC.
 Montana Fouts, and Skyler Wallace were named Freshman All-SEC.
 Sarah Cornell, and Elissa Brown were named SEC All-Defense.
 Sarah Cornell was named SEC Pitcher of the Year.
 Montana Fouts was named SEC Freshman of the Year.
 Patrick Murphy was named SEC Coach of the Year.

Ranking movement

See also
 2019 Alabama Crimson Tide baseball team

References

Alabama
Alabama Crimson Tide softball seasons
Alabama Crimson Tide softball season
Alabama